Bulleidia extructa  is a Gram-positive, anaerobic and non-spore-forming bacterium from the genus of Bulleidia.

References

External links
Type strain of Bulleidia extructa at BacDive -  the Bacterial Diversity Metadatabase	

Erysipelotrichia
Bacteria described in 2000